Soroush Lashkari (born 9 May 1985), known professionally as Hichkas, is an Iranian rapper, singer, and songwriter. Credited with popularizing Persian hip hop to the Iranian people and other Persian-speaking countries such as Afghanistan and Tajikistan, Hichkas's national success and acclaimed works are widely regarded as having broken the barriers that were in place by the Islamic regime for the acceptance of rappers in popular music. Hichkas is considered one of the pioneers of Iranian hip hop and is nicknamed "Father of Persian Rap" by his fans. He became a representation of the Iranian underclass and reflected the angst of the young Iranians. He has been influential for many artists of various genres and is often cited as one of the greatest rappers of Iranian hip hop.

Hichkas is also the founder of the label 021 (alongside Shayan and Yashar) which is considered the first Persian hip hop group. After that, he founded the labels Saamet (alongside RezaPishro and Reveal), and Moltafet (alongside Ali Quf, Ashkan Fadaei, and Dariush and iliyarmeltoo). Hichkas's songs are themed around social and cultural issues in Iran and his lyrical ability and influence pervade the hip hop and rap genre, placing him at the forefront of contemporary Iranian music, inspiring a new generation of Iranian songwriters and artists. Hichkas's first album Jangale Asfalt (The Asphalt-paved Jungle) was the first Iranian hip hop album released in 2005.
Hichkas's early releases combined traditional Persian instruments and urban beats to create a hybrid genre, a combination of east and west.

In addition to performance, Hichkas's work further spans into art direction, production and artist development, working closely with up and coming artists and providing mentoring and coaching, and consistently being the inspiration behind many Iranian artists in urban arts. He has appeared as guest speaker in many universities including Oxford University, Cambridge University, and Calgary University and discussing Iranian poetry, Iranian underground music scene, and the effect of internet on music publishing in Iran.

Hichkas has collaborated with a number of International hip hop artists including the American hip hop artist Kool G Rap. His highly anticipated second album Mojaz (permissible) was released in March 2020, after 8 years of its initial announcement.Soroush Haschim created groups called Moltafet, Samet, 021

Early life
Soroush Lashkary was born on May 8, 1984, in Tehran and is the son of a family of five. He lived in Germany until he was two years old and then lived in the Vanak neighborhood of Tehran. He was studying translation at Garmsar University but has dropped out of college due to personal reasons and pursue of the Persian hip hop. His father is from ziaabadvillage of qazvin and has a family relationship with Hossein Lashkari (pilot of Iran's Air Force who was captured in Iraq during the Iran-Iraq war). Hichkas currently lives in London after emigrating to Great Britain in the aftermath of the 2009 Iranian presidential election protests. He's married to the British-based Iranian feminist activist Azadeh Akbari.

In his early years, Hichkas was known for founding a supergroup called 021 (the area code for Tehran). Around about 2003, he started his music career work in Vanak participating in Persian free-styling with people who also cover some English language songs in the Rap battle. Hichkas gained attention when he began rapping in Persian about social problems and the younger generation in Iran. Hichkas's early releases combined traditional Iranian instruments and urban beats to create a hybrid genre, a combination of east and west.

Discography

Studio albums
Jangale Asfalt (2006)
 Mojaz (2020)

Compilation albums
Anjām Vazife (The Tour of Duty EP) produced by Mahdyar Aghajani (2011)

International collaborations 
Young N Foolish (featuring Kool G Rap, Reveal, Quf) produced by Mahdyar Aghajani (2012)
"Long Live Palestine, Part II" (Lowkey featuring Hichkas, Reveal, Dam, Narcy, Eslam Jawaad, Hasan Salaam, and Shadia Mansour) produced by Nutty P (2010)

 As featured artist 
 "Long Live Palestine, Part II" (Lowkey featuring Hichkas, Reveal, Dam, Narcy, Eslam Jawaad, Hasan Salaam, and Shadia Mansour) produced by Nutty P (2010)
"Chera Badi?" (with Zedbazi) (Why Are You So Mean?) (2012) produced by Alireza JJ
"Chi Shenidi?" (with Fadaei) (2012)

Filmography
 Trip e Ma (Our Style) (2004), music video edited by Fred Khoshtinat
 Ye Mosht Sarbaz (A Bunch of Soldiers) (2008), music video directed by Fred Khoshtinat, with guest appearances by Mahdyar Aghajani, Reveal, Reza Pishro, Ali Quf, Atour and Bahram Nouraei.  Sections of the video are included in the Cultures of Resistance full-length documentary feature film by Iara Lee.
 No One Knows About Persian Cats (2009) feature film directed by Bahman Ghobadi, which won an Un Certain Regard Special Jury Prize Ex-aequo at the Cannes Film Festival.

See also
 Iranian hip hop
 List of Iranian musicians
 Music of Iran
 Persian pop music
 Rock and alternative music in Iran

References

External links 
 
 

Hichkas on Spotify

1985 births
Living people
Iranian hip hop musicians
21st-century Iranian male singers
Singers from Tehran